Koygorodok (Kojgort) is a rural locality (a selo) and the administrative center of Koygorodsky District of the Komi Republic, Russia. Population:

Geography

Climate

References

Notes

Sources

Rural localities in the Komi Republic